Slovakia competed at the 1994 Winter Paralympics in Lillehammer, Norway. 11 competitors from Slovakia won 5 medals, 3 silver and 2 bronze, and finished 19th in the medal table.

Medalists

See also 
 Slovakia at the Paralympics
 Slovakia at the 1994 Winter Olympics

References 

Slovakia at the Paralympics
1994 in Slovak sport
Nations at the 1994 Winter Paralympics